William Airmine may refer to:

William Airmine (MP for Lincolnshire) in 1388, MP for Lincolnshire (UK Parliament constituency)
Sir William Airmine, 2nd Baronet (1622–1658)
Sir William Airmine, 1st Baronet (1593–1651)